Bernard Evans may refer to:
Bernard Walter Evans (1843–1922), British landscape painter
Bernard Evans (architect) (1905–1981), Australian army officer and architect
Bernard Evans (footballer) (1937–2019), English footballer
Bernie Evans (born 1957), Australian rules footballer

See also
Bernard Evans Ward (1857–1933), British painter who emigrated to the United States